Transorchestia enigmatica is a species of beach hopper in the family Talitridae. So far, it has only been found in Lake Merritt in Oakland, California, where it was found by Jim Carlton in 1962. In 1967, Carlton and Edward L. Bousfield of the National Museum of Canada published a paper naming it Orchestia enigmatica. Bousfield re-classified it as Transorchestia enigmatica in 1982. It is not thought to be endemic to California. Its closest known relative is the Transorchestia chiliensis.

References

External links 
 Original paper by Bousfield and Carlton

Amphipoda
Fauna of the San Francisco Bay Area
Crustaceans of the eastern Pacific Ocean